Capraia is an Italian island, the northwesternmost of the seven islands of the Tuscan Archipelago, and the third largest  after Elba and Giglio.

It is also a comune (Capraia Isola) belonging to the Province of Livorno. The island has a population of about 400.

Geography
The island is accessible by ferries that depart from the port of Livorno.

The island is part of the Arcipelago Toscano National Park and marine sanctuary.

The island's small harbour, Porto di Capraia, is connected to the village by the one and only asphalted road on the island. The village, dominated by the Fortress of St George, preserves its original characteristics unaltered. Sites of tourist interest include the Church of the Assunta, the Church of St Nicola and the Sacred Heart of Jesus, the Church and Convent of St Antonio, and the Church of St Stefano alla Piana. The Fortress is not open to visitors.

The island produces wine, and is a centre of the anchovy fishery. About  to the north is the island of Gorgona, which is also famous for its anchovies. In the summer the island is also a popular stopping point for yachts sailing between Livorno, Elba, and Corsica.

History

The Greeks called the island Aegyllon or Aegyllion (Αίγυλλον Greek for Goat Place, see also Giglio). Its current name may have originated in the Etruscan carpa (stone), a word that comes from the archaic Greek Kalpe (sepulchral stone). The Romans called the island Capraria, its name possibly then morphing to reflect the presence of wild goats (or Greek: capros κάπρος, wild boar).

In the 4th century AD it housed a cenobium, where the church of St. Stephen now stands. The early 5th century poet Rutilius recorded that the island was "a mess" and that there were many monastic communities by his time.

In 1055 it was raided by Saracen pirates, and later the Republic of Pisa owned it. It became part of the Republic of Genoa after the Battle of Meloria, being assigned to the patrician Jacopo de Mari (1430). In 1540 the Genoese built the Forte San Giorgio on a pre-existing fortification that the Ottoman corsair Turgut Reis had demolished. The Genoese also built three coastal watch towers (part of a system of Genoese towers) to protect against pirates. The three are:
 Torre del Porto (1541), which protected the entrance to the harbour, and which replaced or added to an earlier tower dating to 1510;
 Torre dello Zenobito (1545); and
 Torre delle Barbici (1699), also known as Torre della Teja or Torre della Regina. It is the only tower with a square shape, which makes it somewhat similar to the De Redin towers on Malta. Torre delle Barbici is in a fairly dilapidated state. Since 2009 a path connects it to the port.

In 1767 troops under Pasquale Paoli of the new independent Corsican Republic occupied Capraia. In 1796 the British, under Admiral Lord Horatio Nelson, occupied the island for a short time, following the creation of the short-lived Anglo-Corsican Kingdom. After the Congress of Vienna in 1815 annexed the Republic of Genoa to the Kingdom of Sardinia, Capraia became part of the province of Genoa. Then in 1925, it was assigned to Livorno.

Between 1873 and 1986 a penal colony occupied almost two-thirds of Capraia. In 1986 the government closed the penal colony and opened the island to visitors.

See also
 List of islands of Italy
 Tuscan Archipelago
 Punta Ferraione Lighthouse

References

External links
Capraia Isola — Tourist information
Capraia Isola: News

Islands of Tuscany
Arcipelago Toscano National Park
Volcanoes of Italy
Capraia Isola